The Secretary of State for Economic Affairs was briefly an office of Her Majesty's government in the United Kingdom. It was established by Harold Wilson in October 1964. Wilson had been impressed by the six-week experiment of a Minister for Economic Affairs in 1947, an office occupied by Stafford Cripps before he was appointed Chancellor of the Exchequer. The office was revived for eight months in 1950 and held by Hugh Gaitskell. After a Conservative victory at the 1951 election,  Churchill also appointed a Minister of Economic Affairs, Arthur Salter, in the period 1951–52.

Wilson's advisers Patrick Blackett and Thomas Balogh advised him to create a new ministry, to be called the Department of Economic Affairs (DEA), in order to drive through his economic plan. Wilson wanted to divide the functions of the Treasury in two, in part to reduce its power. The DEA, as it soon became known, would undertake long-term planning of the economy and industry, while the Treasury would determine short-term revenue raising and financial management. The DEA was therefore tasked with the preparation of a National Plan for the economy, which was published in September 1965.

Critics of Wilson's approach, including Douglas Jay, suspected the main reason for the Department was to appease George Brown, Deputy Leader of the Labour Party. The story (which was true) that Brown finally accepted the job while riding in a taxi with Wilson tended to lend credence to this analysis.

Under Brown, the Department had a reasonable degree of influence. However, Brown was moved to the Foreign Office in August 1966, and the two succeeding secretaries of state were not of his rank. The Treasury was able to claw back its power and the Department had become moribund long before it was wound up in 1969.

The Department of Economic Affairs was the model for the fictional Department of Administrative Affairs in the television series Yes Minister.

Department of Economic Affairs (1947; 1950 and 1951-52)

Minister for Economic Affairs
Colour key (for political parties):

Department of Economic Affairs (1964–1969)

Secretaries of State for Economic Affairs
Colour key (for political parties):

Ministers of State for Economic Affairs
 Anthony Crosland (20 October 1964 – 22 January 1965) Nominally Economic Secretary to the Treasury until 22 December 1964 
 Austen Albu (27 January 1965 – 7 January 1967)   
 Thomas Urwin (6 April 1968 – 6 October 1969)

Under-Secretaries of State for Economic Affairs

Maurice Foley (21 October 1964 – 6 April 1966)   
Bill Rodgers (21 October 1964 – 7 January 1967)   
Harold Lever (7 January 1967 – 29 August 1967)   
Peter Shore (7 January 1967 – 29 August 1967)   
Alan Williams (29 August 1967 – 6 October 1969)   
Edmund Dell (29 August 1967 – 6 April 1968)

References
Source: D. Butler and G. Butler, Twentieth Century British Political Facts 1900–2000

Economic Affairs
Defunct ministerial offices in the United Kingdom
1964 establishments in the United Kingdom
1969 disestablishments in the United Kingdom